In mathematics, the class of L-matrices are those matrices whose off-diagonal entries are less than or equal to zero and whose diagonal entries are positive; that is, an L-matrix L satisfies

See also
 Z-matrix
 Metzler matrix

References

Matrices